Howard Peter Guber (born March 1, 1942) is an American business executive, entrepreneur, educator, and author. He is chairman and CEO of Mandalay Entertainment. Guber's most recent films from Mandalay Entertainment include The Kids Are All Right, Soul Surfer and Bernie. He has also produced Rain Man, Batman, The Color Purple, Midnight Express, Gorillas in the Mist, The Witches of Eastwick, Missing, and Flashdance. Guber's films have grossed over $3 billion worldwide and received 50 Academy Award nominations.

Guber is also co-owner of four professional sports teams: the Golden State Warriors of the National Basketball Association, the Los Angeles Dodgers of Major League Baseball, Los Angeles Football Club (LAFC) of Major League Soccer, and the professional eSports organization aXiomatic Gaming with a controlling interest in one of the world's premier eSports franchises, Team Liquid.

Guber formerly served as chairman of Dick Clark Productions, which produces the American Music Awards, the Golden Globe Awards and other shows. He is also chairman of the Strategic Board; was an investor in NextVR, which sold to Apple in 2020; and is chairman of Mandalay Sports Media. He is co-executive chairman of aXiomatic, a broad-based esports and gaming company. He is a Regent of the University of California and a professor at the UCLA School of Theater, Film and Television and the UCLA Anderson School of Management. For 10 years, Guber was an entertainment and media analyst for Fox Business.

Guber's most recent business book, Tell to Win – Connect, Persuade, and Triumph with the Hidden Power of Story, became a No. 1 New York Times bestseller.

Guber is also noted for other books that include Inside the Deep and Shootout: Surviving Fame and (Mis)Fortune in Hollywood, which became a television series on AMC called Shootout. Guber hosted the show from 2003 to 2008 with Peter Bart, editor of Variety. Guber wrote a cover article for the Harvard Business Review, titled "The Four Truths of the Storyteller".

Early life
Guber was born to a Jewish family in Boston, Massachusetts, the son of Ruth (née Anshen) and Sam Guber (married 1929). His father owned a junk business in Somerville, Massachusetts. As a child, Guber was noted as a "very smart, wired kid" by a childhood acquaintance. He attended John Ward Elementary School and Newton North High School. Guber's childhood included a love of the Boston Red Sox and Fenway Park, which foreshadowed his later participation in the group that purchased the Los Angeles Dodgers.

Following high school graduation, Guber enrolled in the pre-law curriculum at Syracuse University. He played intramural football and rushed the Zeta Beta Tau fraternity.  Guber spent his junior year abroad at Syracuse's Florence, Italy campus. At Syracuse he met his future wife, Tara Lynda Francine Gellis, whom he married in 1964.

Guber enrolled at New York University, where he earned his J.D. and LL.M. law degrees, studying for his MBA at night. As he neared graduation in 1968, Guber accepted a position with Columbia Pictures as a management trainee.

Career

Columbia Pictures
Guber joined Columbia Pictures in 1968, as assistant to Jerry Tokofsky, who headed the studio’s creative affairs department, which had the tasks of evaluating scripts and overseeing actors, directors, and producers. Tokofsky later spoke warmly of Guber’s usefulness to him. 

At Columbia, Guber, an exceptionally early proponent of computerization and entertainment technologies, began computerizing files on working actors and made available tape-recorded summaries of scripts for other executives to listen to while bathing.  A year after arriving at Columbia, Guber, having witnessed a demonstration of an early video cassette machine, published "The New Ballgame/The Cartridge Revolution," an analysis of the changes to be wrought by home video technology, in the journal Cinema.

Guber was transferred to the business affairs division.  Guber paid to fly himself to Columbia's New York City office and successfully argued for his promotion to vice-president of creative affairs.  Shortly thereafter Guber was named head of American production.  In August 1973 he was promoted to vice-president of worldwide production. Steven Spielberg noted that he "used to go to (Guber's) office at Columbia when (he) was just starting. (Guber) had an enormous chart on (his) wall with what every director in the world was planning that listed their pictures in development and planned for production." It made a lasting impression on Spielberg.

During his time at Columbia the studio released, among other films, Shampoo, Taxi Driver, Tommy, and The Way We Were. Upon leaving Columbia in 1975, Guber was given a three-year production deal with the studio.

Independent producer
Guber launched his career as an independent film producer with The Deep (1977), which became the one of the highest-grossing films of the year. Guber also bought the rights and served as executive producer for Midnight Express (1978). Produced by Alan Marshall and David Puttnam, the film earned seven Academy Award nominations including Best Picture. The National Association of Theatre Owners named Guber Producer of the Year.

Casablanca Record and Filmworks
In 1976, Guber merged his company Filmworks with Casablanca Records, headed by Neil Bogart, to form Casablanca Record and Filmworks, Inc. Guber became chairman while Bogart remained president of the combined company. Their record operation included ground-breaking artists such as Kiss, Donna Summer, Captain and Tennille, The Village People, and George Clinton's Parliament-Funkadelic. It also released soundtracks such as Midnight Express, Endless Love, and Flashdance. During this period, Guber also produced several television shows and series, including Television and the Presidency (1984) with Theodore H. White, the 1985 documentary series Oceanquest for NBC, and the 1980 special Mysteries of the Sea for ABC.

PolyGram Filmed Entertainment and the Guber-Peters Company
In 1980, Guber rechristened the film division of Casablanca Filmworks as PolyGram Pictures, which was going to be PolyGram's motion picture and television division where he was Chairman of the Board and CEO. He, along with Neil Bogart and Jon Peters are planning on to be partners of Boardwalk Records, but he had joined PolyGram Pictures at the last minute. He sold his interest in PolyGram in 1982 and then formed and served as co-owner of the Guber-Peters Company (GPC), along with producer Jon Peters.

Films on which Guber served as producer or executive producer have earned more than $3 billion in worldwide revenue and more than 50 Academy Award nominations, including four Best Picture nominations.  Guber's producing credits during this period include Rain Man, Batman, Gorillas in the Mist, The Color Purple, Innerspace, The Witches of Eastwick, Flashdance, Missing, Tango & Cash and An American Werewolf in London.

Sony Pictures
In 1988, GPC became a public company when it merged with game show production company Barris Industries.  On September 7, 1989, Barris Industries was renamed Guber-Peters Entertainment Company. On September 28, 1989, Sony Corporation announced its intention to buy GPEC.  The sale was completed on November 9, 1989, a day after Sony acquired Columbia Pictures Entertainment.

During Guber's tenure as co-chairman and CEO at SPE, the company produced and distributed iconic hit films such as Awakenings, Misery, Flatliners, Terminator 2: Judgment Day, Boyz n the Hood, City Slickers, Basic Instinct, A League of Their Own, Single White Female, A River Runs Through It, A Few Good Men, Sleepless in Seattle, In the Line of Fire, Groundhog Day and Philadelphia.  SPE's Motion Picture Group achieved, over four years, an industry-best domestic box office market share, which averaged seventeen percent. During the same period, Sony Pictures led all competitors with 120 Academy Award nominations, the highest four-year total ever for a single company.  SPE also created and distributed many prime time, half-hour comedy television series at the time, with shows including Married... with Children, Designing Women, Seinfeld, Mad About You and The Nanny.

Mandalay Entertainment
In 1995, Guber formed Mandalay Entertainment as a joint venture with Sony Pictures Entertainment. The multimedia entertainment company has interests in motion pictures, television, sports entertainment and digital media.

Mandalay Pictures
Mandalay Pictures, a division of Mandalay Entertainment Group, produces motion pictures for the global marketplace.  Mandalay has had distributor relationships through first look deals with Universal Pictures, Paramount Pictures and Sony Pictures Entertainment.

In addition to theatrical releases, Mandalay Pictures has produced numerous movies for Netflix.

Mandalay Vision
Mandalay Vision was Mandalay Entertainment Group's independent development, production and financing label. Mandalay Vision's first release, The Kids Are All Right (2010), directed by Lisa Cholodenko and starring Julianne Moore, Annette Bening and Mark Ruffalo, won the Golden Globe for Best Motion Picture – Musical or Comedy, and was nominated for four Academy Awards, including Best Picture.

Mandalay Vision produced Bernie (2011), which premiered at the Los Angeles Film Festival.  The film was directed by Richard Linklater and starred Jack Black, Matthew McConaughey and Shirley MacLaine. Bernie debuted at No. 1 on general release in April 2012 with the best per-theater average for a limited release. Jack Black received a Golden Globe nomination, and the film gained two Spirit Award nominations, as well as a Best Picture nomination at the 2012 Gotham Awards.

Mandalay Television
Mandalay Television produces made-for-television movies and mini-series.

Mandalay Television's Blood Crime, starring James Caan and Jonathan Schaech, was USA network's highest rated Crime Friday movie for 2002.

From best-selling author Nora Roberts, Peter Guber adapted a number of books into Lifetime movies.  More than 34 million viewers tuned in to the first collection of four movies:  Angels Fall, Blue Smoke, Carolina Moon and Montana Sky.

Following the initial Nora Roberts' adaptations, Mandalay Television produced the Nora Roberts II Collection, with four more all-new original movies:  Northern Lights, Midnight Bayou, High Noon and Tribute. The second collection was seen by over 49 million viewers, and Northern Lights was one of the top rated cable movies in 2009. Mandalay Television completed the ninth installment in the franchise, Carnal Innocence, starring Gabrielle Anwar, which premiered on Lifetime in June 2011. The tenth movie, Brazen Virtue, will soon be produced for Netflix.

Mandalay Sports Entertainment
Peter Guber serves as chairman of the board of directors and is the managing partner of Mandalay Baseball LLC, which is a joint venture with ownership of the Los Angeles Dodgers.   Mandalay Baseball recently acquired the Oklahoma City Dodgers, the Triple-A affiliated Minor League Baseball franchise.

Guber previously served as the chairman of the board of directors for Mandalay Baseball Properties, which has owned and operated a national array of affiliated Minor League Baseball franchises and venues. Among the professional sports franchises that have been recently divested by Mandalay Baseball Properties are the Dayton Dragons, a Single-A affiliate of the Cincinnati Reds, which broke the all-time North American professional sports record for consecutive sell outs in 2011 with 815 games encompassing 12 seasons.  In August 2014, the team was sold for the highest price ever paid for a Minor League Baseball franchise.

Mandalay Sports Media
In 2012, Guber and Mandalay Entertainment partnered with CAA Sports and Mike Tollin to create Mandalay Sports Media. The sports media business creates, finances, and acquires operating businesses, intellectual property, and varied enterprises within the sports and media sectors, as well as develops sports-themed entertainment programming for distribution across film, television, mobile and digital.

With Guber executive producing, Mandalay Sports Media made The Last Dance, a ten-part documentary series that chronicles Michael Jordan and the 1990s Chicago Bulls dynasty, which premiered on ESPN on April 19, 2020.  Created in partnership with Netflix, the series became the all-time most-viewed documentary on the network. In 2020, The Last Dance was nominated for three Emmy Awards, and won the Emmy for Outstanding Documentary or Nonfiction Series.  The series also won the NAACP Image Award for Outstanding Documentary (Television) and the Producers Guild Award for Outstanding Producer of Non-Fiction Television.

Dick Clark Productions
In September 2012, Peter Guber and Mandalay Entertainment joined a partnership that purchased Dick Clark Productions from Red Zone Capital Management.  Productions include specials such as The Golden Globes, The American Music Awards, The Academy of Country Music Awards,New Year's Rockin' Eve, and the hit reality show So You Think You Can Dance. The partnership sold DCP in 2016.

Golden State Warriors 
Peter Guber serves as the Co-Executive Chairman of the Golden State Warriors. As co-managing partner, he joined Joe Lacob as the driving forces behind the current ownership group's NBA record-setting bid to purchase the Warriors in 2010. Consultant Marc Ganis said of the purchase, "[t]his could be one of the most valuable teams in the NBA."

The Warriors won their first NBA Championship under Guber and Lacob's leadership in the 2014-15 NBA season.  The Golden State Warriors also won the 2014 Sports Business Journal Award for Team of the Year, with the publication noting that the team "[c]ontinued a sharp trajectory in 2013 under owners Joe Lacob and Peter Guber that produced strong, extensive on- and off-court gains".   Lacob has said of Guber "[h]e cares more than any owner about the team, the image of the team and what the fans think."

Continuing their success, the Warriors went on to win impressive back-to-back NBA Championships in the 2016-17 NBA season and the 2017–18 NBA season.  In 2018, the Golden State Warriors were named Sports Illustrated's Sportsperson of the Year.  In 2019, the Golden State Warriors were named Franchise of the Decade across all professional sports teams by the Sports Business Journal.

In October 2015, Guber and Lacob purchased twelve acres of land in San Francisco's Mission Bay neighborhood to build a privately financed new arena. The move would mark the Warriors' return to a home arena in San Francisco (from Oakland) for the first time in more than four decades. In September 2019, the Warriors opened the Chase Center, the first arena of its type in downtown San Francisco, and played the first game there in October 2019. The $1.4 billion sports and entertainment venue hosts major sporting events, concerts, conventions, family shows and more.  With this arena, the Warriors officially transitioned from a basketball team into a sports and entertainment company. In September 2020, the Sports Business Journal named the Chase Center Sports Facility of the Year.  “This award is a recognition of the vision, planning and execution that went into making Chase Center a world-class sports and entertainment venue,” said Warriors President and Chief Operating Officer Rick Welts. “Chase Center sets the bar when it comes to an immersive fan experience and world-class NBA team amenities.”  The Warriors now lead all major professional teams with four Sports Business Awards.

Los Angeles Dodgers
Guber is an owner of the 2020 MLB World Champion Los Angeles Dodgers.  In 2012, Guber entered into a third partnership with Magic Johnson and teamed up with Guggenheim Baseball Management to purchase the [s]toried Major League Baseball franchise.  Together, the group made the $2.15 billion winning offer, which more than doubled the previous record price for a North American sports franchise."  Under their ownership, the franchise has won the 2013, 2014, 2015, 2016, 2017, 2018 and 2020 National League West Championship.  In 2017, 2018, and 2020, the Dodgers became National League Champions, earning them a place in the World Series.  In 2020, the Dodgers captured the ultimate prize in baseball, bringing the Commissioner’s Trophy back to Los Angeles for the first time in thirty-two years.  The team ended the 2020 regular season with an impressive record.  A .717 winning percentage placed them sixth of all time, and made them the only National League team with a .700-plus win percentage since the 1909 Pirates.  Additionally, Guber owns and serves as Managing Partner of the Dodgers’ Triple- A affiliate, the Oklahoma City Dodgers. In 2018, the Oklahoma City Dodgers were named the Triple-A winner of the prestigious Bob Freitas Award, an honor presented to Minor League Baseball's top franchise based on community involvement, long-term business success, and consistent operational excellence.

Los Angeles Football Club
In October 2014, Peter Guber became the owner and executive chairman of Major League Soccer's Los Angeles Football Club (LAFC).  The ownership group includes sports veteran Tom Penn, Earvin "Magic" Johnson, Mia Hamm Garciaparra and Tony Robbins, among others.  The club debuted in 2018 in a newly constructed, state-of-the-art soccer stadium in the greater Los Angeles area that was built specifically for the team. LAFC's Banc of California Stadium is the first open-air stadium built in Los Angeles since Dodger Stadium in 1962.

In only its second season, LAFC won the 2019 MLS' Supporters' Shield, awarded each year to the team with the best regular season record. That same year, Fast Company named LAFC one of the world's most innovative companies.

In 2020, LAFC's star forward, Diego Rossi, was awarded the MLS Golden Boot award as the top goal scorer of the year in all of Major League Soccer.

Author
Guber's most recent book, Tell To Win - Connect, Persuade, and Triumph with the Hidden Power of Story, became a No. 1 bestseller in The New York Times, USA Today, The Wall Street Journal. Fortune magazine chose Tell To Win as one of their "5 Business Books You Can Really Use."  Peter Guber's other books include Inside the Deep and the Los Angeles Times best-seller Shootout: Surviving Fame and (Mis)Fortune in Hollywood. Guber authored a cover piece for the Harvard Business Review and op-ed pieces for The New York Times.

Of Tell To Win, President Bill Clinton said “In TELL TO WIN, Peter Guber demonstrates that telling purposeful stories is the best way to persuade, motivate and convince who you want to do what you need.”

Robert A. Iger, former president and chief executive officer of The Walt Disney Company said “TELL TO WIN gives great insight into why good storytelling skills are essential for a successful leader. It's both an engaging read and a great practical guide on how to listen, prepare and marshal facts to tell the right kind of story to the right audience.”

Professor and regent of the University of California
Peter Guber is a professor at the UCLA School of Theater, Film, Television and Digital Media and has been a member of the faculty for over 30 years, teaching courses on leadership, digital media, sports entertainment and business storytelling.  He also teaches at UCLA's Anderson School of Management.

Of his storytelling course, Guber said, ""I wanted students to recognize the power of narrative," he said. "Storytelling is not frivolous entertainment. It's an inspirational and professional tool that can bring life into focus."

He is a member of the UCLA Foundation board of trustees, as well as the winner of UCLA's Service Award for his accomplishments and association with the university.  Guber is the chair of the founding board of advisors for the Center for Managing Enterprises in Media, Entertainment & Sports (MEMES) at the UCLA Anderson School of Management.
 In 2017, Guber received the UCLA Medal, the highest honor bestowed upon an individual by UCLA.

In 2017, Guber was appointed to the University of California board of regents by the governor of California, Edmund G. Brown, Jr.  As Regent of the University of California, Guber is part of the governing board responsible for the oversight of all university affairs, providing guidance and perspective on important issues facing public higher education in California.

Speaker
In 2012, Guber was named one of the "Twelve Great Speakers of the Year" by Successful Meetings magazine. Guber's national and global speaking events include Cisco, JWT, Under Armour, Alcoa, HSBC, Twitter, Sodexo, Milken Institute, Intel, Korn Ferry, Women's Wear Daily CEO Summit, Wharton Leadership Conference, GAP, Inc, John Hancock Life Insurance, Experian Marketing, Del Monte Foods, Cox Media Group and Comcast.

aXiomatic and Team Liquid

In 2016, Washington Wizards and Washington Capitals owner Ted Leonsis, former Sony Interactive Entertainment CEO Bruce Stein and Guber founded aXiomatic, a bi-coastal ownership group with a focus on investing in and acquiring esports companies. Leonsis, Stein and Guber recruited the likes of Johnson, AOL co-founder Steve Case and others as investors in aXiomatic. In September 2016, aXiomatic announced it had acquired the controlling interest in esports Team Liquid and appointed Leonsis, Stein and Guber to its board. AXiomatic would receive investment from Tampa Bay Lightning owner Jeff Vinik in June 2017 and Warriors co-owner and Oaktree Capital co-founder Bruce Karsh in March 2018.

AXiomatic acquired controlling interest in one of the world's esports brands, Team Liquid, in 2016. Through strategic partnerships, investments and acquisitions, the team connects esports groups with resources, including venues, technologies, media content, distributions partners and investment capital.  In 2018, aXiomatic participated in a $1.25 billion strategic investment round for Epic Games, maker of Fortnite, one of the most-played and popular titles ever. In January 2019, aXiomatic participated in a $245 million strategic investment round for Niantic, Inc., maker of Harry Potter: Wizards Unite and Pokémon Go, the incredibly successful title that, in June 2018, surpassed the $2 billion mark in revenue.

Films produced

Film

Miscellaneous crew

Music department

Thanks

Television

Books
Guber is the author of three books.  His 2011 book, Tell to Win, reached No. 1 on the New York Times Hardcover Advice & Miscellaneous Best Sellers list.

Personal life
Guber is married to Lynda Francine "Tara" Gellis, with whom he has four children: Elizabeth Sugarman, Jodi Brufsky, Samuel Guber, and Jackson Guber.

Citations

Further reading

External links
 
 
 Peter Guber Keynote Speaker Biography

1942 births
American chief executives
American film studio executives
Businesspeople from Boston
Columbia Pictures people
Film producers from Massachusetts
Golden State Warriors owners
Jewish American baseball people
Living people
Los Angeles Dodgers executives
Los Angeles Dodgers owners
New York University School of Law alumni
New York University Stern School of Business alumni
Newton North High School alumni
Sony Pictures Entertainment people
21st-century American Jews